Hamdi is a masculine Arabic given name and surname. Notable people with the name include:

Given name
 Hamdi Aslan (born 1967), Turkish footballer and coach
 Hamdi Al Banbi (1935–2016), Egyptian engineer and politician
 Hamdi Braa (born 1986), Tunisian  basketball player
 Hamdi Harbaoui, Tunisian footballer
 Hamdi Kasraoui, Tunisian footballer
 Hamdi Kayapınar (born 1979), Turkish serial killer
 Hamdi Marzouki (born 1977), Tunisian footballer
 Hamdi al-Pachachi (1886–1948), Iraqi politician
 Hamdi Salihi (born 1984), Albanian footballer
 Hamdi Ulukaya (born 1972), Turkish businessman and entrepreneur of Kurdish descent
 Hamdy Wahiba, retired Egyptian military officer

Middle name
 Ahmet Hamdi Boyacıoğlu (1920–1998), Turkish judge
 Ahmet Hamdi Tanpınar (1901–1962), Turkish writer
 Osman Hamdi Bey (1842–1910), Turkish archaeologist
 Serpil Hamdi Tüzün, Turkish youth coach

Surname
 Baligh Hamdi (1932–1993), Egyptian composer
 Emad Hamdy or Hamdi (1909–1984), Egyptian actor
 Omar Hamdi, Syrian Kurdish artist
 Yaser Esam Hamdi, former American citizen who was captured in Afghanistan in 2001

See also
 Hamdi v. Rumsfeld, United States Supreme Court case
 Hamdy (disambiguation)

Arabic-language surnames
Arabic masculine given names
Turkish-language surnames
Turkish masculine given names